The positivist calendar was a calendar reform proposal by Auguste Comte (1798–1857) in 1849. Revising the earlier work of Marco Mastrofini, or an even earlier proposal by "Hirossa Ap-Iccim" (Hugh Jones), Comte developed a solar calendar with 13 months of 28 days, and an additional festival day commemorating the dead, totalling 365 days.

This extra day added to the last month was outside the days of the week cycle, and so the first of a month was always a Monday. On leap years, an additional festival day (also outside the week cycle), to celebrate holy women, would join the memorial day of the dead. The scheme followed the Gregorian calendar rules for determining which years are leap years, and started on January 1. Year 1 "of the Great Crisis" (i.e. the French Revolution) was equivalent to 1789 in the standard Gregorian system.

Much like Comte's other schemas, the positivist calendar never enjoyed widespread use.

Months 

The months were named, in chronological historical order, for great figures in Western European history in the fields of science, religion, philosophy, industry and literature. Each day of the year was named after neither  Catholic Saints as in the Gregorian calendar nor after Île-de-France agriculture as in the French Republican calendar but after figures in history in various fields. Weeks and days were also dedicated to great figures in history as a secular version of the concept of saint's days. In all, the Positivist Calendar "contains the names of 558 great men of all periods, classified according to their field of activity." Villains of history were also commemorated in order to be held up for "perpetual execration". Napoleon, according to Comte, was especially deserving of this fate.

Months were named:
Moses
Homer
Aristotle
Archimedes
Caesar
Saint Paul
Charlemagne
Dante
Gutenberg
Shakespeare
Descartes
Frederick
Bichat

Criticism 
In 1849, Comte wrote that he called his calendar a "breach of continuity" with the old way of thinking, and his Humanistic calendar was part of that breach. He called it, "a provisional institution, destined for the present exceptional century to serve as an introduction to the abstract worship of Humanity."

Aside from the religious references the calendar carried, Duncan Steel, author of Marking Time, believes the novelty of the calendar's month names alone helped prevent the wide acceptance of this proposal.

Author Tricia Lootens writes that the idea of naming days after literary figures, as if they were Catholic Saint days, didn't catch on outside the Positivist movement.

Advantages 

The several advantages of the Positivist calendar are mainly related to its organization. The subdivision of the year is very regular and systematic: 
 Every year has exactly 52 weeks divided in 13 months.
 Each month has exactly 28 days divided in 4 weeks.
 Every day of the month falls on the same weekday in each month (i.e. the 17th always falls on a Wednesday).

The calendar is the same every year (perennial), unlike the annual Gregorian calendar, which differs from year to year. Hence, scheduling is easier for institutions and industries with extended production cycles.  Movable holidays celebrated on the nth certain weekday of a month, such as U.S. Thanksgiving day, would be able to have a fixed date while keeping their traditional weekday.

Statistical comparisons by months are more accurate, since all months contain exactly the same number of business days and weekends, likewise for comparisons by 13-week quarters. Supporters of the Positivist calendar have argued that thirteen equal divisions of the year are superior to twelve unequal divisions in terms of monthly cash flow in the economy.

Disadvantages 

While each quarter would be equal in length (13 weeks), thirteen is a prime number, placing all activities currently done on a quarterly basis out of alignment with the months.

Christian, Islamic and Jewish leaders are historically opposed to the calendar, as their tradition of worshiping every seventh day would result in either the day of the week of worship changing from year to year, or eight days passing when "The Festival of All the Dead” or “The Festival of Holy Women" occurs. 

Birthdays, significant anniversaries, and other holidays would need to be recalculated as a result of a calendar reform, and would always be on the same day of the week. This could be problematic for Public holidays that would fall under non-working days under the new system; eg. If a public holiday is celebrated on January 8, under the Positivist calendar that holiday would always fall on a Sunday, Moses 8, which is already a non-working day, and compensatory leave would have to be given each year on Moses 9, thus essentially changing the date of the holiday to Moses 9.  A vast amount of administrative data, and the software that manages that, would have to be corrected/adjusted for the new system, potentially having to support both the IFC and the standard local time keeping systems for a period of time.

See also
 International Fixed Calendar
 Positivism
 Religion of humanity
 Secular humanism
 World Calendar

Notes

External links
Interactive positivist calendar
Calendrier positiviste, Auguste Comte, April 1849 (1993 re-edition). Scanned pages as PDF from Gallica.
Calendrier positiviste, Catéchisme positiviste, ou Sommaire Exposition de la religion universelle en treize entretiens systématiques entre une femme et un prêtre de l'humanité, Auguste Comte, Apostolat positiviste (Paris), 1891. From Gallica - Bibliothèque Nationale de France.
The Thellid Calendar is a modern calendar similar to the Positivist calendar.

1849 introductions
Proposed calendars
Auguste Comte
Specific calendars
1849 works